HH equation may refer to:

Henderson–Hasselbalch equation
Hodgkin–Huxley model